Susana Veiga (born 2000) is a Portuguese Paralympic swimmer who competes in international elite events. She specializes in freestyle, S9. She competed at the 2020 Summer Paralympics in 50 freestyle S10 and 100 freestyle S9.

Career
She competed at the, 2018 European Para Swimming Championships winning the Silver in 50 freestyle S9, 2019 World Para Swimming Championships,2020 European Para Swimming Championships winning a silver medal, and 2021 European Para Swimming Championships, winning a gold medal and European Record.

References 

Living people
Paralympic swimmers of Portugal
1999 births
Swimmers from Lisbon
Portuguese female freestyle swimmers
Swimmers at the 2020 Summer Paralympics
Medalists at the World Para Swimming Championships
Medalists at the World Para Swimming European Championships
S9-classified Paralympic swimmers